Nationality words link to articles with information on the nation's poetry or literature (for instance, Irish or France).

Events
 Ludovico Ariosto begins work on his Orlando Furioso

Works published
 Publio Fausto Andrelini, Eclogues, full of proverbial expressions
 William Dunbar, Scotland
 Stephen Hawes, The Passtyme of Pleasure (completed, approximate date), England
 Niccolò Machiavelli, The First Decade (Decennale primo), Italy

Births
Death years link to the corresponding "[year] in poetry" article:
February – George Buchanan (died 1582), Scottish historian, scholar, humanist and poet
Approximate date – Hwang Jini (died c.1560), Korean poet

Deaths
Birth years link to the corresponding "[year] in poetry" article:
 Mihri Hatun (born unknown), female Ottoman poet
 Johannes von Soest (born 1448), German composer, theorist and poet

See also

 Poetry
 16th century in poetry
 16th century in literature
 French Renaissance literature
 Grands Rhétoriqueurs
 Renaissance literature
 Spanish Renaissance literature

Notes

16th-century poetry
Poetry